Vasco de Paiva Vilaça (born 21 December 1999) is a Portuguese triathlete. He won the gold medal at the 2017 European Triathlon Championships on the Junior Men category and later on, a silver medal at the ITU World Triathlon Grand Final in Rotterdam also on the Junior category.

Vasco also competes in Super League Triathlon. He finished 12th in the 2019 Championship series and 4th in 2021. He finished in second place at the inaugural SLT Arena Games, held in Rotterdam, 2020. Vilaca took his first Super League Triathlon Championship Series event podium in Munich, in the 2022 series, when he finished 2nd behind Australian Triathlete Matthew Hauser.

Personal life 

His one year older sister, Vera Vilaça, is also an elite Portuguese triathlete with both of them being national champions on almost every age category.

References 

1999 births
Living people
Portuguese male triathletes
S.L. Benfica (triathlon)
Sportspeople from Lisbon